Sotiris Ventas (born 15 March 1945) is a Greek wrestler. He competed in the men's Greco-Roman 48 kg at the 1972 Summer Olympics.

References

1945 births
Living people
Greek male sport wrestlers
Olympic wrestlers of Greece
Wrestlers at the 1972 Summer Olympics
Place of birth missing (living people)
20th-century Greek people